The small-headed blind snake (Anilios affinis) is a species of snake in the Typhlopidae family.

References

Anilios
Reptiles described in 1889
Snakes of Australia